James Atkinson (1846 – 1914) of Hampstead was a British engineer who invented several engines with greater efficiency than the Otto cycle. The Atkinson cycle engines were named the "Differential 1882", "Cycle 1887" and "Utilite 1892". The most well-known of Atkinson's engines is the "Cycle 1887", patented in 1887. By use of variable engine strokes from a complex crankshaft, Atkinson was able to increase the efficiency of his engine, at the cost of some power, over traditional Otto-cycle engines.  He was awarded the John Scott Medal of The Franklin Institute in 1889.

See also
History of the internal combustion engine

Notes

Further reading

External links
 James Atkinson at Find A Grave - personal details

1846 births
1914 deaths
People from Hampstead
Engineers from London